"Milquetoast" is the first single by the American alternative metal band Helmet from their 1994 album, Betty. It is the album's fourth track and only charting single, reaching #39 on Billboard's Mainstream Rock Tracks chart.

Prior to Betty'''s release, the song appeared in alternate form (mixed by Butch Vig, with notably added feedback loops in the chorus and a distorted outro instead of a fade-out) on The Crow'' soundtrack as "Milktoast". A music video, using sequences from "The Crow" movie, was made for "Milktoast", and went into regular rotation on MTV.

Track listing

Chart performance

References

Helmet (band) songs
1994 singles
1994 songs
Songs written by Page Hamilton
Interscope Records singles
Music videos directed by Alex Winter
Song recordings produced by Butch Vig